Alberto Winkler (13 February 1932 – 14 June 1981) was an Italian competition rower and Olympic champion.

He received a gold medal in the coxed four event at the 1956 Summer Olympics in Melbourne, together with Romano Sgheiz, Angelo Vanzin, Franco Trincavelli and Ivo Stefanoni.

References

External links 
 
 
 
 

1932 births
1981 deaths
Italian male rowers
Olympic rowers of Italy
Olympic gold medalists for Italy
Rowers at the 1956 Summer Olympics
Olympic medalists in rowing
Medalists at the 1956 Summer Olympics
People from Kastelbell-Tschars
European Rowing Championships medalists
Sportspeople from Südtirol